Senator Strange may refer to:

Luther Strange (born 1953), U.S. Senator from Alabama from 2017 to 2018
Robert Strange (American politician) (1796–1854), U.S. senator from North Carolina from 1836 to 1840